Paria pratensis is a species of leaf beetle. It is found in the eastern United States and eastern Canada (Ontario, Quebec and New Brunswick). One known host plant is the prairie rose (Rosa setigera).

References

Further reading

 
 
 

Eumolpinae
Beetles described in 1970
Beetles of North America